Stefan Höhener (born 13 June 1980 in Gais AR) is a Swiss luger who has competed since 1999. Competing in three Winter Olympics, he earned his best finish of 13th in the men's singles event at Salt Lake City in 2002.

Höhener's best finish at the FIL World Luge Championships was fifth in the men's singles event at Igls in 2007. His best finish at the FIL European Luge Championships was seventh in the men's singles event at Cesana in 2008.

From 2014 to her retirement in 2018, Höhener coached fellow Swiss luger Martina Kocher.

References

 
 
 Lugesport.com profile
 2002 luge men's singles results
 2006 luge men's singles results

External links
 

1980 births
Living people
Swiss male lugers
Olympic lugers of Switzerland
Lugers at the 2002 Winter Olympics
Lugers at the 2006 Winter Olympics
Lugers at the 2010 Winter Olympics
Swiss sports coaches
21st-century Swiss people